Primer is the sixth studio album by the a cappella group Rockapella and marks their North American debut. Its track list was intended to represent the band's live show at the time and was recorded 99% live-in-studio over the course of two days at Sonalysts Studios in Connecticut, with the exception of the bonus track, "Shambala," which was recorded prior to the Sonalysts sessions.

Track listing

Personnel
Scott Leonard – high tenor
Sean Altman – tenor
Elliott Kerman – baritone
Barry Carl – bass
Jeff Thacher – vocal percussion

References

1995 albums
Rockapella albums